SN 1000+0216 was an extremely remote superluminous supernova (SLSN), which occurred in between June and November 2006 in the constellation Sextans. Its peak far-ultraviolet absolute magnitude reached −21.5, which exceeded the total absolute magnitude of its host galaxy. The distance (redshift) to this supernova  makes it the most distant supernova observed as of 2012. The luminosity of SN 1000+0216 evolved slowly over several years as it was still detectable in November 2008. Both the high luminosity and slow decay indicate that the supernova's progenitor was a very massive star. The supernova explosion itself was likely either a pair-instability supernova or a pulsational pair-instability supernova similar to the SN 2007bi event. It also had some similarities to the low redshift SN 2006gy supernova. Overall classification of SN 1000+0216 remains uncertain.

References

External links
 Light curves on the Open Supernova Catalog
 12 Billion-Year Old Supernova Discovered by Astronomers
 Elemental origins glimpsed in 12 billion year old supernova

Supernovae
200611??
Sextans (constellation)